Fire & Ice: The Dragon Chronicles is a 2008 fantasy action film by MediaPro Pictures and the Sci Fi Channel directed by Pitof (As of 2022, it is the last film Pitof has ever directed, making it his longest hiatus between projects)

The special effects and the CGI were entirely created in Romania.

Premise
Ruled by King Augustin and Queen Remini, Carpia is a peaceful kingdom in a world inhabited by dragons and knights. When the King dies suddenly, the land's serenity is unexpectedly shattered by a Fire Dragon that spreads almighty fear and death amongst the kingdom's innocent people, especially against the Ice Dragon.

Cast
 Amy Acker as Princess Luisa
 Tom Wisdom as Gabriel
 John Rhys-Davies as Sangimel
 Arnold Vosloo as King Augustin
 Oana Pellea as Queen Remini
 Răzvan Vasilescu as Paxian Ru
 Cabral Ibacka as Pontiero
 Ovidiu Niculescu as King Quilok
 Loredana Groza as Lila

References

External links
 

English-language Romanian films
Romanian fantasy films
2008 action films
Fantasy adventure films
Films shot in Bucharest
MediaPro Pictures films
Films set in the Middle Ages
Syfy original films
Films about dragons
2008 films
Films directed by Pitof
2000s English-language films
2000s American films